Sam Adams Bolton (born 9 December 2002) is a British ski jumper and current national record holder.

Bolton was born in Halifax, West Yorkshire, England and moved to Calgary, Canada at the age of five.  After initially playing hockey, Bolton discovered ski jumping whilst taking part in a summer camp at Calgary's Winsport facility in 2011. Following a development career in North America, competing in FIS Race, FIS Cup and Continental Cup series competitions, he now predominantly trains and competes in Europe.

British record 
Bolton set the current British record at the age of 16 on the large hill (HS140) at Whistler Olympic Park, Canada on 17 March 2019, when he jumped 134.50m to finish second in the FIS NORAM tournament. His second jump in that competition (119.50m) equalled the second longest jump by a British jumper in any FIS competition.

Youth Olympics 
Sam Bolton took part in the 2020 Winter Youth Olympics and finished 18th.

See also
 Eddie the Eagle

References

2002 births
Living people
British male ski jumpers
Sportspeople from Halifax, West Yorkshire
Ski jumpers at the 2020 Winter Youth Olympics
British emigrants to Canada
Skiers from Calgary